is a party game for the Nintendo 64. It was released only in Japan.

References 

1998 video games
Detective video games
Imagineer games
Japan-exclusive video games
Nintendo 64 games
Nintendo 64-only games
Party video games
Multiplayer and single-player video games
Video games developed in Japan